Thornham is a suburban area straddling Middleton, Royton and Rochdale in Greater Manchester, England. The area crosses the border of the Metropolitan Borough of Oldham and the Metropolitan Borough of Rochdale and is divided at a constituency and electoral ward level.

Historically part of Lancashire, Thornham was once a township within the parish of Middleton, encompassing the outlying hamlets of Slattocks, Stake Hill, Buersill Head and Tandle Hill, before being divided between Middleton, Royton, and Rochdale by the Local Government Act 1894. Part of this area was known as Gravel Hole, because of large gravel pits, and is still referred to as such on some maps.

Governance
Lying within the historic county boundaries of Lancashire since the early 12th century, Thornham was a township in the ecclesiastical parish of Middleton and Oldham poor law union. In 1879, part of the township was included in the area of the commissioners for the improvement of Middleton and Tonge townships, and in 1886 became part of the municipal borough of Middleton. In 1879, other parts of the township were included in the Royton and Castleton-by-Rochdale local boards of health. In 1894 the township was dissolved and its area divided between Middleton, Royton Urban District and Castleton-by-Rochdale Urban District, with the latter district divided between the County Borough of Rochdale and Municipal Borough of Heywood in 1900.

Transport
The intersection of the M62 and the A627(M) is known as Thornham Interchange.

Education
Thornham is served by "Thornham St. James Cof E Primary School" (which lies within the border of Royton and is thus administered by Oldham L.E.A) and "St John's CE Primary Thornham" (which lies within Rochdale), and thus administered by Rochdale L.E.A. For secondary education, St Cuthbert's RC High School is also located in the Rochdale part of the area.

Notable people
Sir Harry Platt, 1st Baronet, orthopaedic surgeon

References

Areas of the Metropolitan Borough of Rochdale
Geography of the Metropolitan Borough of Oldham